Mark McCall (born 29 November 1967 in Bangor, County Down, Northern Ireland) is an Irish former rugby union player and current Director of Rugby (DoR) at Saracens. While DoR for Saracens the team has won the English Premiership Rugby competition five times and the European Cup three times. He played 11 times for the Ireland national rugby union team, making his debut against New Zealand on 30 May 1992 as a substitute.

Playing career
McCall (nicknamed "Smally") played a Five Nations match against Wales in 1994, and came off the bench to play against England in 1996 as well as Australia later that year. He played four times in 1997; against New Zealand, Canada and twice against Italy. He also played against Scotland and England in the 1998 Five Nations, finishing his career later that year with two matches against South Africa. His entire 13-match career went without him scoring a single point internationally. He scored more than 100 points for his club career. He was forced to retire as a player at the age of 31 due to a prolapsed disc. McCall played at Inside Centre.

Coaching career
McCall's career in coaching originated at Ulster but has also included short stints with Ireland A and Castres, before moving to Saracens.

Ulster

After a brief pause, post-retirement McCall started as a formal coach for both Ireland U21s and Ireland A as well as a deputy coach for Ulster. This converted to a full time position by 2001 and in 2004, with the departure of Alan Solomons he became Head Coach at Ulster. In 2006, McCall would take Ulster to victory in the Celtic Cup. Under his tutelage nine Ulster players played in the Irish team, the highest number since the game went professional. However, within 18 months, McCall handed his resignation with Ulster bottom of the Magners League and poor European performance.

Castres

McCall, along with friend and fellow Ulsterman Jeremy Davidson, joined a new coaching team being established at Castres after dismissals forced by a poor early start and team dissension. The new coaching setup's minimum target was to ensure a top-six finish (to guarantee Heineken Cup qualification), which was managed with a fifth-place finish.

Saracens
He signed with Premiership Rugby side Saracens to join up with new coach Brendan Venter for the 09/10 season as first team coach; after Brendan Venter left midway through the 2010/2011 season he took charge as Director of Rugby, at the beginning of 2013 he renewed his contract until the end of 2015. In the 2010–11 season his team was unbeaten and went on to win the Premiership. In the 2012 season he managed them to go on to be the only English team to qualify for the Heineken Cup. 

McCall, though he has appeared far less in the news than his predecessor, who was penalised several times for speaking against rugby's organising bodies, was notable in attacking the difficulties being faced by English teams within the Heineken Cup. He has also appeared in the news for his radical increasing of the rotation system at Saracens, despite occasional controversy, either on account of lost chances by Saracens or accusations that rotational policy undermines the sport. Although this seems to be successful for McCall.

McCall defeated Harlequins to win Saracens' first European Semi-final to lead Saracens to the Heineken Cup Final in 2014 where they lost to Toulon.

In 2015 McCall's Saracens won the Aviva Premiership against Bath 28-16.

The 2015–16 season saw McCall take his team to even higher heights by successfully completing the double. Saracens successfully retaining the Aviva Premiership trophy by defeating Exeter 28-20 while defeating Racing 92 in the second final of the European Champions Cup. McCall's rotation strategy proved particularly successful, enabling Saracens to win all 9 games in the Cup - a first in European rugby. While McCall has been significantly quieter in the media than his predecessor, he openly challenged the timing of an England training session shortly before the ECC began which led to multiple player injuries.

The 2016–17 season would allow a double at the ECC Cup, beating Clermont 28-17 before an early knock-out in the AP, losing in the semi-finals against Exeter.

Heading into the 2017/18 season McCall would note the knock-on effects of the Lions tour – tiredness and, especially, lack of pre-season time. This looked to become true as Saracens fell into a seven-game losing streak (the worst in over a decade) towards the end of 2017, with a bare mathematical scrape into the ECC Quarter-Finals. Saracens would then be knocked out against Leinster (the ultimate ECC champions), their earliest departure in six years. However additional rest time enabled a strong AP run-in, with a 27-10 defeat of Exeter to retake the AP trophy.

While McCall is frequently known as quiet and generally turns down interviews, his performances and widespread respect have also led to him being awarded the Aviva Premiership Director of Rugby in 2012/13, 2013/14, 2015/16 and 2018/19.

In April 2021, he signed a four-year contract extension which will see him remain at Saracens until at least the 2024–25 season. In January 2022 it was confirmed he would take a short break from the role for medical reasons. He returned in March 2022.

Personal
McCall went to school at Bangor Grammar in Northern Ireland where he learnt rugby and excelled to the point of becoming captain of the first team. He was also a first team cricket player, as was his father Conn who played cricket for Ireland.

McCall has a law degree (a qualification he shared with his brother, Peter) and worked part time at a solicitor's office between retiring as player and taking up coaching.

He has two children – Bryn and Jemma – who were born two years apart.

References

1967 births
Living people
Irish rugby union coaches
Irish rugby union players
Ireland international rugby union players
London Irish players
Ulster Rugby players
Ulster Rugby non-playing staff
People educated at Bangor Grammar School
People from Bangor, County Down
Dungannon RFC players
Rugby union players from County Down
Saracens F.C. coaches